Byrnes is a surname. Notable people with the surname include:

Adam Byrnes (born 1981), Australian lawyer and retired rugby union player
Brittany Byrnes (born 1987), Australian actress
Burke Byrnes (born 1937), American actor
Darcy Rose Byrnes (born 1998), American actress
Edd Byrnes (1932–2020), American actor
Eric Byrnes (born 1976), American baseball player and announcer
Erin Byrnes, American politician
Esther Byrnes (1867–1946), American biologist and science teacher
Garrett Byrnes (born 1971), American composer
Gene Byrnes (1889–1974), American comic artist
Giselle Byrnes, New Zealand historian
James Byrnes (sailor) (1838–1882), Irish-American sailor and Union Navy officer in the Civil War
James F. Byrnes (1882–1972), American politician
Jim Byrnes (actor) (born 1948), American actor and musician
Jim Byrnes (baseball) (1880–1941), American baseball player 
John A. Byrnes (1897–1963), American lawyer, politician, and judge 
John W. Byrnes (1913–1985), American politician
Josephine Byrnes (born 1966), Australian actress
Josh Byrnes (born 1970), American baseball executive
Josh Byrnes (politician) (born 1974), American politician
Kevin P. Byrnes (born 1950), U.S. Army general
Mark Byrnes (born 1982), Australian soccer player
Marty Byrnes (born 1956), American basketball player
Michael Byrnes (writer), American writer
Michael J. Byrnes, American Roman Catholic bishop
Norman Byrnes (botanist) (1922–1998), Australian botanist
Norman Byrnes (lawyer) (1922–2009), American lawyer
Pam Byrnes (born 1947), American politician
Pat Byrnes, American cartoonist
Richard Byrnes (1832–1864), Irish-American Union Army officer in the Civil War
Rob Byrnes (born 1958), American writer
Shannon Byrnes (born 1984), Australian rules footballer
Steve Byrnes (1959–2015), American television announcer and producer
Syd Byrnes (born 1940), South African cyclist
Thomas F. Byrnes (1842–1910), American police officer
Thomas Joseph Byrnes (1860–1898), Australian politician; 12th Premier of Queensland
Tommy Byrnes (1923–1981), American basketball player
Tracy Byrnes (born 1970), American business journalist
Tricia Byrnes (born 1974), American snowboarder
William Byrnes (1809–1891), Australian politician
William B. Byrnes (1906–1989), American politician

See also
Byrnes Mill, Missouri
Hale-Byrnes House, Stanton, New Castle County, Delaware
Byrnes Cove, Ireland
Burns (surname)
Byrne
Byrns
Bryne (disambiguation)